Piquero is a surname. Notable people with the surname include:

Alex Piquero (born 1970), American criminologist
Nicole Leeper Piquero, American criminologist, wife of Alex

See also
Piquer